Grayland is a Metra commuter railroad station in the Old Irving Park neighborhood in Chicago, Illinois, along the Milwaukee District North Line. In Metra's zone-based fare system, Grayland is in zone B. As of 2018, Grayland is the 132nd busiest of Metra's 236 non-downtown stations, with an average of 357 weekday boardings.

As of December 12, 2022, Grayland is served by 40 trains (19 inbound, 21 outbound) on weekdays, by all 20 trains (10 in each direction) on Saturdays, and by all 18 trains (nine in each direction) on Sundays and holidays.

The station is an open platform shelter near the Union Pacific Railroad crossing/remote-Tower A-5. Parking is available on Kilbourn Avenue along the west side of the tracks south of Milwaukee Avenue, and on-street parking is also available on Kilbourn Avenue along the east side of the tracks north of Milwaukee Avenue.

The station was opened in 1873 to service Grayland, at the time a suburb of Chicago (annexed in 1889) created by subdividing John Gray's farm. Gray deeded the land the already built depot was on to the Chicago, Milwaukee & St. Paul Railroad in return for a promise to maintain and service the depot, thus insuring that the inhabitants of Gray's subdivision would have easy transport to Chicago and back.

Bus connections
CTA
 56 Milwaukee
 152 Addison (1 block south at Addison and Milwaukee Ave.)

References

External links

Station from Google Maps Street View

Grayland
Former Chicago, Milwaukee, St. Paul and Pacific Railroad stations
Railway stations in the United States opened in 1873